Lisa J. Peterson (born 1964) is an American diplomat and the former United States Ambassador to Eswatini. She was nominated by President Barack Obama on September 16, 2015, and confirmed by the Senate on Nov. 19, 2015. She left her post on January 20, 2021. Between January 20 and July 14, 2021, she served in the Biden administration as the Acting Under Secretary of State for Civilian Security, Democracy, and Human Rights in 2021.

Early life and education
Peterson is a 1986 graduate of the University of Rochester, where she earned a Bachelor of Arts in political science.

Career
After college graduation Peterson accepted a position at the University of Rochester's Carlson Mathematics and Sciences Library. In 1988 she joined the University's Department of Chemistry.

In 1989 Peterson joined the Foreign Service. She served in the embassy in the Central African Republic, and after two years accepted a two-year assignment as vice consul at the U.S. Consulate General in South Africa.

Peterson then returned to the U.S. an analyst for Bolivia, Ecuador and Peru in the Bureau of Intelligence and Research. In 1996 she began a series of international assignments to Kinshasa, Democratic Republic of the Congo; Lusaka, Zambia, and Nairobi, Kenya.

In 2006 Peterson returned to the U.S. as deputy director of the Office of Central African Affairs in the Bureau of African Affairs.

In 2007 she returned to Africa as the cultural officer in Abuja, Nigeria. Two years later she became deputy chief of mission at the embassy in Yaounde, Cameroon.

When she was nominated on November 16, 2015  to become United States Ambassador to Swaziland (now Eswatini), she was Director of the Office of Multilateral and Global Affairs in the U.S. Department of State's Bureau of Democracy, Human Rights, and Labor, a position she had held since 2012.

Personal
Peterson is married to Siza Ntshakala, a fellow State Department employee. They have a son.

References

 

1964 births
Living people
21st-century American diplomats
Ambassadors of the United States to Eswatini
American women ambassadors
Obama administration personnel
Biden administration personnel
University of Rochester alumni
United States Foreign Service personnel
21st-century American women